A list of films produced in Pakistan in 1969 (see 1969 in film) and in the Urdu language:

1969

See also
 1969 in Pakistan

References

External links
 Search Pakistani film - IMDB.com

1969
Pakistani
Films